Lucas Verthein Ferreira (born 12 May 1998) is a Brazilian rower. He competed in the 2020 Summer Olympics.

At the 2016 World Rowing Junior Championships in Rotterdam, he won a bronze medal in JM1x.

At the 2019 Pan American Games, he won a bronze medal in double sculls.

At the 2020 Olympic Games in Tokyo, by qualifying for the semifinals of Men's single sculls, he equaled the best Brazilian position in the entire history of rowing in the Olympics. The only other Brazilian to reach this level was Paulo César Dworakowski, in Moscow 1980.

References

1998 births
Living people
Sportspeople from Rio de Janeiro (city)
Rowers at the 2020 Summer Olympics
Brazilian male rowers
Olympic rowers of Brazil
Pan American Games medalists in rowing
Pan American Games bronze medalists for Brazil
Rowers at the 2019 Pan American Games
Medalists at the 2019 Pan American Games
21st-century Brazilian people